James McNally is a British musician, composer and producer, formerly of the bands Afro Celt Sound System, the Pogues, Storm. and Dingle Spike.

He released a solo album, Everybreath, in 2008, which included covers of U2's "I Still Haven't Found What I'm Looking For" and The Police's "Every Breath You Take".

Awards 

McNally was nominated twice for Grammy Awards for Best World Music Album, in 2002 for Volume 2: Release and again in 2004 for Volume 3: Further in Time.

References 

The Pogues members
Tin whistle players
English record producers
English people of Irish descent
Living people
Afro Celt Sound System members
Year of birth missing (living people)